Cricket at the 2007 South Pacific Games was contested by five teams. Papua New Guinea won the gold medal, Fiji won the silver, and Samoa won the bronze. Tonga and New Caledonia were the other participating nations.

Tournament

Unlike the 2003 tournament, no finals matches were held, with the gold medal going to the team that topped the pool stage. This was Papua New Guinea, who won all four of their matches, including a record-breaking 510 run win over New Caledonia.

Final standings

References

Official site
2007 South Pacific Games at CricketEurope
2007 South Pacific Games at CricketArchive

2007
2007 in Oceanian sport
2007 South Pacific Games
International cricket competitions in Samoa